France competed at the 2013 Summer Universiade in Kazan, Russia from 6 July to 17 July 2013. 214 athletes are a part of the French team.

France won 26 medals (11th place), including 5 gold medals (13th place).

References

Nations at the 2013 Summer Universiade
2013